Who's to Know is an album by violinist Shankar recorded in 1980 and released on the ECM label.

Reception
The Allmusic review by Stephen Cook awarded the album 4½ stars stating "For this 1980 session, the violinist focuses on the traditional ragas of his native India, with two extended pieces... On the first raga (both pieces here are reconfigurations of traditional ragas), he moves from a meditative solo stretch to some frenetic interplay with Hussein, eventually ending the piece with an incredible, lightning-fast display of technique. The group opt for a more even-keeled pace on the second raga. Shankar is impressive again, while Hussein makes the best of some lengthy solo spots. An essential disc for L. Shankar fans".

Track listing
All compositions by Shankar
 "Ragam Tanam Pallavi" - 22:11 
 "Ananda Nadamadum Tillai Sankara" - 23:45 
Recorded at Tonstudio Bauer in Ludwigsburg, West Germany in November 1980

Personnel
Shankar - 10-string double violin, tamboura
Umayalpuram K. Sivaraman - mridangam
Zakir Hussain - tabla
V. Lakshminarayana - conductor (tala keeping)

References

ECM Records albums
Lakshminarayana Shankar albums
1981 albums
Albums produced by Manfred Eicher